This is a list of South African television-related events in 2016.

Events
22 May - Richard Stirton wins the first season of The Voice South Africa.
6 November - Kryptonite Dance Academy win the seventh season of SA's Got Talent.

Debuts

Domestic
31 January - The Voice South Africa (M-Net) (2016–present)

International
1 January -  Zoo (M-Net)
2 August - / My Little Pony: Friendship is Magic (Nicktoons)
8 September -  Of Kings and Prophets (M-Net Edge)
26 September - / Counterfeit Cat (Disney XD)
 Messy Goes to Okido (SABC3)
 The Loud House (Nickelodeon)

Changes of network affiliation

Television shows

1980s
Good Morning South Africa (1985–present)
Carte Blanche (1988–present)

1990s
Top Billing (1992–present)
Generations (1994–present)
Isidingo (1998–present)

2000s
Idols South Africa (2002–present)
Rhythm City (2007–present)
SA's Got Talent (2009–present)

See also
2016 in South Africa

 
2016 in South Africa